List of airports in Canada is an organized list of registered airports and certified aerodromes in Canada.
Due to the size of the list it has been broken down into the following:

See also 
 Transport in Canada
 Wikipedia:WikiProject Aviation/Airline destination lists: North America#Canada

References 
 
 

 

Canada
Airports